The Liberty Mutual Coach of the Year Award was an annual college football award given to the a head coach from each NCAA division. The award honored coaches who succeed on and off the field, displaying sportsmanship, integrity, responsibility, and excellence. Each coach who won was given $50,000 to donate to the charities of his choice, and a $20,000 grant for alumni association scholarships from the school the coach represents.

Winners

Division I FBS

Note: In 2006, the award was only given to a Division I FBS coach.

Division I FCS

Division II

Division III

References

College football coach of the year awards in the United States
Awards established in 2006
Awards disestablished in 2013
Coach of the Year Award